Parliamentary elections were held in the Free City of Danzig on 18 November 1923. The German National People's Party emerged as the largest party, receiving 27% of the vote and winning 33 of the 120 seats in the Volkstag. Voter turnout was 82%.

Results

References

Elections in the Free City of Danzig
Danzig
November 1923 events in Europe